Lorena is a municipality in the state of São Paulo in Brazil.

General

Lorena is part of the Metropolitan Region of Vale do Paraíba e Litoral Norte. The population is 89,125 (2020 est.) in an area of 414.16 km2. The elevation is 524 m, after the political emancipation of Canas, its last district.

The city was originated when a farm was constructed at the end of the 17th century. It became a parish in 1718, a municipality in 1788 and is a city since 1856.  The city is now the seat of the Roman Catholic Diocese of Lorena.
Its main business areas are industry, services and agro-business.
It is also a highlight in region due to its three colleges, including areas from human to exact sciences.

The municipality contains the  Lorena National Forest, created in 1934.

Population history

Demographics
According to the 2010 IBGE Census, the population was 82,553, of which 80,182 are urban and 2,371 are rural.  The average life expectancy for the municipality was 70.64 years. The literacy rate was at 94.13%.

References

External links
  http://www.lorena.sp.gov.br
  citybrazil.com.br
  Lorena on Explorevale
  The city of Lorena and several other places in the Vale do Paraíba

Municipalities in Vale do Paraíba e Litoral Norte
Municipalities in São Paulo (state)